Lockman is a surname. Notable people with the surname include:
Vic Lockman (1927-2017), American cartoonist and comic strip writer
Whitey Lockman (1926-2009), American Major League Basebell player, coach, and manager 
Norman Lockman, managing editor of The News Journal from 1984 to 1991

See also
Lockman Foundation, interdenominational Christian ministry
Loughman